The World Christian Conference (WCC) is an annual conference that is held near Santa Cruz, California. The stated purpose is to mobilize Christians to become strategically involved in God's plan to make disciples of all nations.

History 
The conference started in 1985 as the World Christian Conference for Chinese Graduates (WCCCG). Its conveners saw the need to bring fellow Christians together and challenge them to engage in evangelism throughout the world as well as the need for more workers in North America.

Each year, since 1985, conference attendees from churches on the West Coast and beyond have come together in a forum where biblical teaching is given, models and examples are presented, and practical issues are discussed.  

Since 1985, WCC has gained momentum reaching over 400 in attendance each year.

Speakers 
 2014 - Dr. L, Timothy Paul Svoboda
 2012 - Patrick Fung, Leslyn Musch
 2011 - Viji Nakka-Cammuaf, Philip Gee
 2010 - John Lo, Donna Fong
 2009 - Sabastian Huynh, Michelle Rickett
 2008 - George Verwer, Jackie Pullinger
 2007 - Thom Wolf
 2006 - Loren Cunningham, Keith Wheeler
 2005 - Jimmy Seibert
 2004 - Bob Sjogren
 2003 - Marilyn Laszlo, Lee Yi
 2002 - Greg Fritz, Chi-Hok Wong

External links
 World Christian Fellowship 

Christian conferences